Dolichoderus rugosus is a species of ant in the genus Dolichoderus. Described by Smith in 1858, the species is endemic to South America.

References 

Dolichoderus
Hymenoptera of South America
Insects described in 1858